The Imensazan Consultant Engineers Institute (ICEI) is a subsidiary of Khatam al-Anbia in Iran. It is blacklisted by the United States Department of the Treasury.

References

Engineering companies of Iran